Hrubá Vrbka is a municipality and village in Hodonín District in the South Moravian Region of the Czech Republic. It has about 600 inhabitants.

Notable people
Gorazd of Prague (1879–1942), bishop and saint
Martin Řehák (1933–2010), athlete

References

Villages in Hodonín District
Horňácko